Boso (died after 940?) was a Burgundian nobleman who spent much of his career in Italy, where he became Margrave of Tuscany about 932. He ruled semi-autonomously and was a benefactor of the churches of his region. He lost his office in 936 and probably returned to Burgundy.

Years in Provence
Boso was the second son of Count Theobald of Arles and Bertha, illegitimate daughter of King Lothair II. His elder brother Hugh was born in 880/1. His family belonged to the highest ranks of the aristocracy of the Carolingian Empire and were related by marriage to the Carolingian dynasty and the Bosonids, the ruling family of Provence.

After Theobald's death (895), Boso's mother remarried to Adalbert the Rich, then margrave of Tuscany. Boso and Hugh inherited their father's counties. After the Emperor Louis III was blinded by his foes in 905, Hugh assumed the regency in Provence and the county of Arles, while Boso took over the county of Avignon. In 907, Hugh and Boso entered Italy with an army in support of their mother. In 926, after Hugh had become King of Italy, he appointed Boso regent of Provence. In 931 he brought Boso to Italy at the same time as he made his son, Lothair, co-ruler in order to strengthen his position against the powerful margrave Lambert of Tuscany. Lambert was the reputed son of Adalbert and Bertha and half-brother of Hugh and Boso. According to Liutprand of Cremona, the rumours of the time had it that Bertha, unable to conceive, in order to safeguard her second husband's succession, had feigned pregnancy and presented as her own two sons, Lambert and Guy, who were actually the children of others.

Early years in Italy
In his earliest documented presence in Italy, Boso is found intervening on behalf of the Patriarchate of Aquileia on 17 October 931. The first document recording his rank of "margrave" (marchio) dates to 1 July 932, when he persuaded the king to make a donation to the church of Saint Martin in Lucca.

According to Liutprand of Cremona, when Hugh forbade Lambert of Tuscany to call himself a half-brother of the king, the margrave challenged Hugh to a judicial duel, which he won. In order to obtain the march of Tuscany for himself, Boso convinced Hugh to arrest Lambert; who was subsequently blinded in prison. A more likely explanation than Liutprand's is that Lambert refused give up his quasi-independence and as a result Tuscany was taken from him.

Margrave of Tuscany
Few notices from Boso's rule in Tuscany have survived. Most deal with his interventions with the king on behalf of the churches of Lucca and Arezzo. The last reference to Boso as margrave of Tuscany comes from 17 September 936, when he sent representatives to oversee an exchange of property by the diocese of Lucca. Later that year, Hugh removed his brother from the march and placed his own illegitimate son, Hubert, there instead.

Liutprand claims that Boso was arrested on suspicion of plotting against the king at the instigation of his wife, Willa of Burgundy. Another possible explanation is that he continued to act as autonomously as Lambert had and Hugh removed him in favour of a more pliant margrave. Boso had married his daughter Willa, named for her mother, to Berengar of Ivrea, one of the most powerful margraves in the kingdom. This aristocratic axis may have seemed like a threat to Hugh, precipitating Boso's downfall.

Later years
In 940 a certain "illustrious count Boso" (inclitus comes Boso) made a donation to the monastery of Saint-Barnard-de-Romans. This is probably the same person as the margrave of Tuscany, since the monastery is known to have been patronised by Hugh and there were family possessions in the region. By his wife, Willa, perhaps a daughter of Rudolph I of Upper Burgundy, Boso left behind four daughters: Richilda, Gisla, Willa and Bertha. This last married first Boso, son of Duke Richard of Burgundy, and second Raymond, the duke of Aquitaine. It was to her that Hugh bequeathed his huge personal wealth and his Provençal possessions.

References
Notes

Citations

Sources

Margraves of Tuscany
Bosonids